Betty or Bettie is a name, a common diminutive for the names Bethany and Elizabeth. In Latin America, it is also a common diminutive for the given name Beatriz, the Spanish and Portuguese form of the Latin name Beatrix and the English name Beatrice. In the 17th and 18th centuries, it was more often a diminutive of Bethia.

Notable people

Athletes
 Betty Cuthbert (1938–2017), Australian sprinter and Olympic champion
 Betty Jameson (1919–2009), American Hall-of-Fame golfer and one of the founders of the LPGA
 Betty McKilligan (born 1949), Canadian pairs figure skater
 Betty Nuthall (1911–1983), English tennis player
 Betty Pariso, American bodybuilder
 Betty Stöve (born 1945), Dutch tennis player
 Betty Ann Grubb Stuart (born 1950), American tennis player
 Betty Uber (1906–1983), English badminton and tennis player

Journalists and media personalities
 Betty Elizalde (1940–2018), Argentine journalist and broadcaster
 Betty Kennedy (1926–2017), Canadian broadcaster, journalist and author
 Betty Nguyen (born 1974), American news anchor

Performing artists and fashion models
 Betty Alberge (1922–1991), British actress
 Betty Arvaniti (born 1939), Greek actress
 Betty Boije (1822–1854), Finnish-Swedish contralto and composer
 Betty Boo (born 1970), stage name of English singer and songwriter Alison Moira Clarkson
 Betty Bronson (1906–1971), American actress 
 Betty G, a stage name of an Ethiopian singer and songwriter Bruktawit Getahun
 Betty Buckley (born 1947), American actress
 Betty Burbridge (1895–1987), American actress
 Betty Carter (Lillie Mae Jones) (1929–1998), American jazz singer
 Betty Cody (1921–2014), Canadian-born American country music singer
 Bette Davis (1908–1989) American actress
 Bettie de Jong (born 1933), Dutch rehearsal director and dancer
 Betty Deland (1831–1882), Swedish actress
 Betty Driver (1920–2011), British actress and singer
 Betty Everett (1939–2001), American soul singer
 Betty Faria (born 1941), Brazilian actress
 Betty Garrett (1919–2011), American actress, comedian, singer and dancer
 Betty Grable (1916–1973), American actress, singer, dancer and pin-up girl
 Betty Harlafti, Greek mezzo-soprano and singer
 Betty Harris (born 1939), American soul singer
 Betty Hutton (1921–2007), American actress and singer
 Betty Kelly (born 1944), American singer, member of Martha and the Vandellas
 Betty Knox (Alice Elizabeth Peden) (1906–1963), part of Wilson, Keppel and Betty, a British music hall and vaudeville act
 Betty Kuuskemaa (1879–1966), Estonian actress 
 Betty Moschona (1927–2006), Greek actress
 Bettie Page (1923–2008), American pin-up and fetish model
 Betty Stockfeld (1905–1966), Australian actress
 Betty White (1922–2021), American actress, best known for Life with Elizabeth, The Mary Tyler Moore Show and The Golden Girls
 Betty Who (born 1991), Australian-American singer and musician
 Betty Wright (1953–2020), American soul and R&B singer and songwriter 
 Betty (singer) (born 2003), Armenian child singer

Politicians and activists
 Betty Apiafi (born 1962), Nigerian MP and educator
 Betty de Boer (born 1971), Dutch politician
 Betty Boothroyd (1929–2023), British MP and former Speaker of the House of Commons
 Betty Friedan (1921–2006), American feminist and author of The Feminine Mystique
 Betty Hall (1921–2018), American politician
 Bettie Hewes (1924–2001), Canadian politician
 Betty Komp (born 1949), American politician
 Betty Ray McCain (1931-2022), American politician
 Betty McCollum (born 1954), American politician
 Betty Shabazz (1934–1997), American educator and civil rights advocate, wife of Malcolm X
 Betty Williams (Nobel laureate) (1943–2020), North Irish peace activist
 Betty Williams (politician) (born 1944), Welsh politician and MP

Visual artists
 Bettie Cilliers-Barnard (1914–2010), South African abstract artist
 Betty Curnow (1911–2005), New Zealand painter and printmaker
 Betty Muffler (born 1944), Aboriginal Australian artist and healer
 Betty Parsons (1900–1982), American artist, art dealer, and collector

People in other fields
 Madeleine Passot "Betty" (1914–2009), French Resistance agent
 Acid Betty (born 1977), American drag queen
 Betty Ang, Filipina businesswoman
 Betty Bentley Beaumont (1828–1892), British author, merchant
 Betty Ford (1918–2011), First Lady of the United States, wife of Gerald Ford
 Betty Jackson (born 1949), British fashion designer
 Betty Joseph (1917–2013), British psychoanalyst
 Betty Klimenko (born 1959), Australian businessperson and motorsport team owner
 Betty Linderoth (1822–1900), Swedish clockmaker
 Betty MacDonald (1908–1958), American author
 Betty Mitchell (1896–1976), Canadian theatre director and educator
 Betty Siegel (1931–2020), American author, and president of Kennesaw State University
 Betty (slave) (c. 1738–1795), one of Martha Washington's slaves
 Bettie, a black cook at the Battle of the Alamo - see List of Texian survivors of the Battle of the Alamo
 Lady Betty (Lady Elizabeth Hastings) (1682–1739), philanthropist
 Lady Betty (Elizabeth Sugrue) (c. 1740/1750–1807), Irish executioner

Fictional characters
 Betty, a character in the 1991 American comedy movie What About Bob?
 Betty (Naked Brothers Band), in the TV series The Naked Brothers Band.
 Betty, the title character of the comic strip Betty (1920–1943) by Charles A. Voight
 Betty, the title character of Yo soy Betty, la fea, a Colombian soap opera, basis for the US TV series Ugly Betty
 Betty, the antagonist of the comedy film Kung Pow! Enter the Fist (2002)
 Atomic Betty or 'Betty Barrett', Cartoon Network-Teletoon's first child superhero
 Boxcar Betty (Boxcar Bertha), a fictional hobo and Industrial Workers of the World organizer
 Brickhouse Betty, the title character from the animated cartoon series featured on Playboy TV and the Internet
 Betty Blue, the main character of the film Betty Blue
 Betty Boop, a Paramount Pictures cartoon character
 Betty Brant, a Marvel Comics supporting character
 Betty Burke, a character from Power Rangers Beast Morphers
 Betty Childs-Skolnic, a character in the Revenge of the Nerds film series
 Betty Cooper, a comic book character published by Archie Comics
 Betty Draper, a character in the TV series Mad Men.
 Betty Eagleton, a character in the British soap opera Emmerdale
 Betty Gordon, the protagonist of a series of children's novels
 Betty Kane, now known as Bette Kane
 Betty Lou, a muppet character on Sesame Street
 Betty Rizzo, a character in the film Grease (1978), played by Stockard Channing
 Betty Ross, Bruce Banner's love interest in the Hulk comics
 Betty Rubble, a Flintstones character
 Betty Slug, the lead character in the Canadian comic strip Betty
 Betty Smith, a character in the TV series Littlest Pet Shop
 Betty Spencer, the wife of Frank Spencer in the British sitcom Some Mothers do 'ave 'em
 Betty Suarez, the title character and heroine of the TV series Ugly Betty
 Betty Sutton, a character in the 1995 American romantic drama movie A Walk in the Clouds
 Betty Lou Who, a character in the 2000 American Christmas fantasy comedy movie How the Grinch Stole Christmas
 Betty Williams (Coronation Street), in the British soap opera Coronation Street

See also
Bette (given name)
Betti (given name)
Bettye, given name
Bety, nickname
Betty (surname)
Betty (novel), by Tiffany McDaniel
Mitsubishi G4M, Japanese WWII naval bomber, codenamed "Betty"

References

English feminine given names
English given names
Hypocorisms